Károly Lakat (27 November 1920 – 3 December 1988) was a Hungarian footballer and coach.

Lakat played for Győri AC, Szegedi AK and Ferencvárosi TC and was capped 13 times for Hungary.

Lakat coached Gödöllői Dózsa, Vörös Meteor, Szegedi Haladás, Tatabányai Bányász, Hungary, Hungary (Olympic), MTK, Ferencvárosi TC, Budapest Honvéd, Salgótarjáni BTC, Volán SC and Debreceni VSC.

Managerial honours

References

1920 births
1988 deaths
Hungarian footballers
Hungary international footballers
Ferencvárosi TC footballers
Hungarian football managers
Hungary national football team managers
MTK Budapest FC managers
Ferencvárosi TC managers
Budapest Honvéd FC managers
Debreceni VSC managers
FC Tatabánya managers
Association football midfielders
Nemzeti Bajnokság I managers
Sportspeople from Győr